David Puth is an American financial services executive. He was named chief executive officer of Centre in 2020. Centre governs the technology, policy, compliance, audit and reserve standards for USD Coin (USDC), the fastest growing dollar-based digital currency in the world.

Puth is a former member of the New York Federal Reserve Foreign Exchange Committee, the Bank of England Joint Standing Committee and former Chairman of the Bank of International Settlements' Market Participants Group where he led the foreign exchange (FX) market's input to the development of a single global code of conduct covering the FX market.

Puth was a member of the Foreign Exchange Committee, sponsored by the Federal Reserve Bank of New York, which he chaired from 1992 to 2002.

Education 
Puth studied Political Science and Government at Tufts University in Boston, graduating with a Bachelor of Arts degree in 1979.

Career 
Puth's career spans more than three decades in financial markets, including 19 years at J.P. Morgan where he served in a variety of senior global leadership roles with oversight of the bank's FX, interest rate derivatives, commodities and emerging markets businesses.

Puth spent more than 19 years at J.P. Morgan from 1988 to 2007. He held several senior roles at the bank including Global Head of Currencies and Commodities until November 15, 2006. He also served as a managing director and was a member of J.P. Morgan Chase' Executive Committee.

In 2008, Puth joined State Street as Executive Vice President and Head of Global Markets where he oversaw sales, trading and investment research across multiple asset classes. He was also responsible for Currenex, Sate Street's electronic foreign exchange brokerage arm.

Centre 
Puth was appointed chief executive officer (CEO) to Centre in 2020. The technology behind Centre makes it possible to exchange value between people, businesses and financial institutions just like email between mail services and texts between SMS providers.

CLS 
Puth served as chief executive officer (CEO) and Director at CLS Group from 2012 to 2018. CLS is a specialist financial system that provides settlement services to its members in the foreign exchange market to mitigate settlement risk.

FX Global Code 
David Puth served as the Chair of the Market Participants Group for the drafting of the Bank of International Settlements Global FX Code of Conduct for the foreign exchange market.

In this role, he was responsible for leading the market participants input to create a voluntary code of conduct for all wholesale foreign exchange market participants.

The Global FX Code aims to establish a single set of common guidelines and principles of good practice for responsible participation in the wholesale FX market. The Global FX Code is being developed by the Foreign Exchange Working Group (FXWG).

The Code was published in two halves, the first on May 26, 2016 and the second on May 25, 2017.

Philanthropic work 
Puth is a board member and leads the audit and finance committee for the Robin Hood Foundation. He is also a trustee of the Institute of Contemporary Art in Boston.

References

Living people
American financial businesspeople
Year of birth missing (living people)